Daly Cherry-Evans (born 20 February 1989) is an Australian professional rugby league footballer who plays as a  for the Manly Warringah Sea Eagles in the NRL and Australia at international level.

He captains Manly and won the 2011 NRL Grand Final with the Sea Eagles. He captains Queensland at State of Origin level and has played for Prime Ministers XIII.

Early life
Cherry-Evans was born in Redcliffe, Queensland, Australia to an English-born mother and an Australian father. His brother Darcy Cherry-Evans is a professional scooter rider and his brother Dylan Cherry-Evans is also a former rugby league player. He also has two sisters, Kaci and Klanci Cherry-Evans

He began playing rugby league for the Redcliffe Dolphins at 5-years-old. At 12 years of age Cherry-Evans moved to Mackay, Queensland with his family and continued to play junior rugby league for the Mackay Brothers. He attended St Patrick's College during his high school years. He also attended Redcliffe State High School and was a part of the reddy boys. At the beginning of 2008 Cherry-Evans was invited by Dennis Moore to trial with the Manly-Warringah Sea Eagles and later signed a contract to play for their under-20s National Youth Competition team.

Playing career

National Youth Competition (2008-09)

Cherry-Evans played 46 games for the National Youth Competition team of Manly Warringah Sea Eagles over the 2008 and 2009 season where he scored 246 points in total including 24 tries. He was named on the interchange bench of the 2009 Toyota Cup season's team of the year.

Sunshine Coast (2010)

At the conclusion of the 2009 Toyota Cup season, Cherry-Evans found himself behind Trent Hodkinson as Manly's first grade halfback after the departure of club captain Matt Orford. As a result, Cherry-Evans was sent to play for Manly's Queensland Cup feeder club the Sunshine Coast Sea Eagles. After captaining the team for most of the season, Cherry-Evans was named the Queensland Cup Player of the Year, and Rookie of the Year. His performances in the side saw him selected to the Queensland Residents team where he was also named team captain.

2011

In Round 12 against the Brisbane Broncos at Suncorp Stadium, Cherry-Evans scored his first NRL career tries in the Sea Eagles 34–10 victory, one of which was set up by a flick pass from  Brett Stewart who while diving for the ball had scooped it up one handed and passed to Cherry-Evans in the same movement. In round 13 against the Bulldogs, Cherry-Evans crossed the try line untouched from a scrum, performed a one-on-one strip on Dene Halatau, and had 3 try assists in a dominating display that saw him named as halfback in the BigPond Sport Team of the Week. In October 2011, English coach Steve McNamara offered Cherry-Evans a starting spot on the England team for the 2011 Four Nations as he is eligible for England through his English born mother Kellie. Cherry-Evans declined the offer, declaring himself available only to play representative football for both Queensland and Australia should he be selected.

Cherry-Evans won the 2011 Dally M Rookie of the Year award, and scored a try in Manly's victory over the New Zealand Warriors in the 2011 NRL grand final. He gave a perfect inside pass for Brett Stewart to score the first try of the match in the 30th minute of the game. His own try just before the game's half time was set up by an audacious grubber kick by Clive Churchill Medal winner Glenn Stewart. The Manly  grubber kicked for winger Michael Robertson on his own 20 metre line. Robertson regathered and raced 50 metres down field, evading a desperate tackle from Manu Vatuvei, before passing to Matt Ballin who continued the run until tackled only 5 metres out from scoring. On the next play Cherry-Evans received the ball from halves partner Kieran Foran, threw two dummy-passes and scored next to the posts to give the Sea Eagles a match winning 12–2 lead after Lyon's conversion. Manly went on to defeat the Warriors 24–10 to win their 8th premiership, with DCE the first rookie halfback to lead his team to premiership success since "Slippery" Steve Morris won with St George in 1979. Cherry-Evans finished his excellent debut year in the NRL in the 2011 NRL season with him playing in all 27 Manly-Warringah Sea Eagles matches, scoring 7 tries, kicking 25 goals and 3 field goals. He was named by the Rugby League International Federation in its annual awards as the world's best halfback for 2011.

2012
Cherry-Evans played in all 27 Manly Warringah Sea Eagles matches and scored 7 tries, kicked 3 goals and kicked 1 field goal during the 2012 NRL season.

2013
Since he made his debut for Manly in Round 1 of the 2011 NRL season, Cherry-Evans had not missed a single game of the NRL. Due to his selection for Qld in Game III of the 2013 Origin series, DCE missed his first game for the Sea Eagles, missing their Round 18 clash with North Queensland in Townsville. Cherry-Evans won the Clive Churchill man of the match medal in the Sea Eagles 26-18 Grand Final defeat by the Sydney Roosters. Cherry-Evans is the third player since the award's inception in 1986 to win the Medal from a losing Grand Final side and one of four who have achieved the honour, joining Canberra's Bradley Clyde (1991), St George's Brad Mackay (1993) and Canberra's Jack Wighton (2019). Cherry-Evans played in 27 matches, scored 11 tries and kicked 2 field goals for the Sea Eagles in the 2013 NRL season.

2014
On 14 February 2014, Cherry-Evans was selected in the Sea Eagles inaugural 2014 Auckland Nines squad. In Round 24 against the Parramatta Eels at Parramatta Stadium, Cherry-Evans played his 100th NRL career match in the Sea Eagles 22–12 loss. On 22 September 2014, Cherry-Evans was selected in the Australian Four Nations train-on squad. On 29 September 2014, at the 2014 Dally M Awards, Cherry-Evans was named 2014 Dally M Halfback of the Year.

2015 
Cherry-Evans captained the Sea Eagles during the 2015 Auckland Nines competition. His team lost each of its matches throughout the pre-season competition.

On 6 March 2015, Cherry-Evans revealed he had agreed to join the Gold Coast Titans team in 2016 on a 4-year contract. He changed his mind to stay with the Sea Eagles on an 8-year deal on 3 June, before the NRL's Round 13 cooling off period expired. During the announcement, Cherry-Evans was quoted as saying: "I definitely left the door open for this speculation to continue because, to be honest, I was always curious to know what offer was going to be on the table from Manly". He was subsequently booed at later games in Brisbane and the Gold Coast. The deal was rumoured to be over $10m AUD or $1.25m per season.

2016
In June 2016, Cherry-Evans suffered an ankle injury that kept him out of action for a month. Cherry-Evans had a poor 2016 season with the Sea Eagles finishing off the season in thirteenth place. Although he showed small glimpses of what he could do, the 10 million dollar man scored 5 tries during the 2016 season and played 19 games.

2017
On 13 January 2017 following the retirement of long time Manly premiership winning captain Jamie Lyon, Cherry-Evans was named as Manly's club captain for the 2017 NRL season. After a poor 2016, Daly Cherry-Evans hit back at the critics by having a great 2017, by leading the Sea Eagles to the finals since 2014. The Sea Eagles were eliminated from the 2017 NRL Finals Series. At the end of the year he was named Player of the Year by the Manly Warringah Sea Eagles for this great season. At the end of the 2017 season Daly played all 25 games for the sea eagles scoring 6 tries and kicking 9 goals.

2018
On 28 May, Cherry-Evans was not selected to play in Queensland's 2018 State of Origin squad.
On 2 July, Cherry-Evans was named to play in the game 3 of the 2018 State of Origin series due to injuries suffered within the Queensland squad.

During the 2018 season Daly played 24 games, scoring 8 tries and kicking 65 Goals. Even though Manly finished 15th at the end of the 2018 NRL season, He was a stand out and was selected for both of the test Matches between New Zealand national rugby league team and Mata maa Tonga where Daly scored a try in the 34–16 win at Mt Smart Stadium.

2019
In Round 3, Cherry-Evans scored 2 tries and kicked 7 goals as Manly defeated the New Zealand Warriors 46–12.  On 27 May, Cherry-Evans was picked to play at Halfback for the Queensland Maroons side and was also picked as the 15th Captain of the Queensland Maroons side. Cherry-Evans played in all 3 games of the 2019 State of Origin series as Queensland lost the series 2–1.

In Round 19, Cherry-Evans kicked the winning field goal in golden point extra-time as Manly defeated Melbourne 11–10 at AAMI Park.

Cherry-Evans made a total of 21 appearances for Manly in the 2019 NRL season as the club finished 6th on the table and qualified for the finals.  Cherry-Evans played in both finals matches as Manly reached the elimination semi-final against South Sydney but were defeated 34-26 ending their season. On 7 October, Cherry-Evans was named in the Australian side for the Oceania Cup fixtures.

2020
Cherry-Evans made a total of 20 appearances for Manly-Warringah in the 2020 NRL season as the club finished a disappointing 13th on the table.

2021
In round 5 of the 2021 NRL season, Cherry-Evans kicked a field goal for Manly-Warringah in the final seconds of the game to defeat the New Zealand Warriors 13–12.  It was Manly's first win of the year having lost the opening four games.

In round 7, Cherry-Evans scored two tries for Manly in a 40–6 victory over the Wests Tigers.
In round 19, he scored two tries for Manly in a 44–24 victory over the Wests Tigers.
Cherry-Evans played 25 games for Manly in the 2021 NRL season including the club's preliminary final loss against South Sydney.

2022
In round 3 of the 2022 NRL season, Cherry-Evans kicked the winning field goal late in the match to earn Manly their first win of the season over Canterbury with a 13–12 victory.

Cherry-Evans played a total of 22 games for Manly in the 2022 NRL season as the club finished 11th on the table missing the finals.

In October he was named in the Australia squad for the 2021 Rugby League World Cup.

2023
In round 1 of the 2023 NRL season, Cherry-Evans scored his first career hat-trick in Manly's 31-6 victory over Canterbury.

Statistics

Last updated: 16 July 2022

Honours
Individual
 Manly-Warringah Sea Eagles Ken Arthurson Rookie of The Year: 2011
 Dally M Rookie of The Year: 2011
 RLIF Halfback of The Year: 2011, 2013
 RLPA Rookie of The Year: 2011
 Manly-Warringah Sea Eagles Gordon Willoughby Medal - Members Player of The Year: 2013, 2018, 2020
 Manly-Warringah Sea Eagles Players' Player: 2013
 Clive Churchill Medal: 2013
 Dally M Halfback of The Year: 2014
 Spirit of ANZAC Medal: 2015
 Manly-Warringah Sea Eagles Roy Bull Best and Fairest: 2017, 2020
 Manly-Warringah Sea Eagles Captain: 2017, 2018, 2019, 2020, 2021, 2022
 Manly-Warringah Sea Eagles Steve Menzies Medal - Play of the Year: 2019 (Game-winning field goal in golden point win over Melbourne Storm Rd19)
 Queensland Maroons Captain: 2019, 2020, 2021, 2022
 Australia Kangaroos Vice-Captain: 2019, 2020, 2021, 2022

Club
 2011 NRL Grand Final Winners
 2012 World Club Challenge Runner-up
 2013 NRL Grand Final Runner-up

Representative
 2013 State of Origin series Winners
 2013 World Cup Winners
 2014 Four Nations Runner-up
 2015 State of Origin series Winners
 2020 State of Origin series Winners
 2022 State of Origin series Winners

Controversy
On 21 April 2018, Cherry-Evans was fined $10,000 by Manly after an altercation with fellow Manly player Jackson Hastings. The incident involving Hastings and Cherry-Evans resulted in Hastings being ostracised from the playing group.  An altercation on the training field in the lead-up to the side's 32–20 loss to The Gold Coast carried forward when the players attended a Gladstone strip club after the game and then flared up even further at the team hotel later in the night. Hastings left the club due to continued altercations with Cherry-Evans and subsequently played in the Super League and back in the NRL for the Wests Tigers.

In June 2018, former teammate Willie Mason claimed that when he was at Manly that nobody wanted to play alongside Cherry-Evans and that he was the reason there was such a divide at the club.  Mason went on to say "I was there in 2015, I’ve never seen, never been involved in a team, that I could just see such a divide in a club, It was because of Cherry-Evans. All this shit that’s been happening around him, like, something’s wrong, "He then signed with the Gold Coast Titans for like 10 years", Mason said.  "And then there was a big fucking meeting, Cherry-Evans has got something to say. "I just signed a deal with the Titans boys, blah blah blah".  "I’m like, who gives a fuck, you don’t hold a meeting about that. No one cared"

Mason's comments came in the wake of former Manly player Anthony Watmough commenting on a podcast calling Cherry-Evans a "fuckwit" and that he was the reason other players needed to depart the club.

Representative rugby league career

Allegiance
Although Cherry-Evans was born in Brisbane, the fact that his great-grandmother is English made him eligible to represent either Australia or England at the test level. In 2011, England coach Steve McNamara offered Cherry-Evans a starting spot on the English team for the 2011 Four Nations tournament. Cherry-Evans declined the offer, declaring himself available only to play representative football for both Queensland and Australia should he be selected.

Australia
In October 2011, coach Tim Sheens named Cherry-Evans in the Australian Four Nations squad. He made his test debut for Australia against Wales and scored a try at the Racecourse Ground in Wrexham. He was selected for Australia's 2012 Anzac Test against New Zealand but did not take to the field.

Cherry-Evans was selected in the Kangaroos 24 man squad for the 2013 Rugby League World Cup squad, playing in 5 matches and scoring 2 tries. His form in the tournament saw him selected to play from the bench in Australia's 34–2 win over New Zealand in the 2013 Rugby League World Cup Final played in front of an international record attendance of 74,468 at the Old Trafford stadium in Manchester.

Cherry-Evans' form in the early part of the 2014 NRL season saw him secure a position on Australia's interchange bench for the 2014 ANZAC Test in the Kangaroos 30–18 win over New Zealand at Sydney Football Stadium.

Queensland
Queensland coach Mal Meninga selected Cherry-Evans as the 18th man for Game I of the 2012 and 2013 State of Origin series but he did not play in either game. He made his State of Origin debut for Queensland as an interchange in Game II of the 2013 series in front of a home crowd at Suncorp Stadium. Cherry-Evans played his part in Queensland's record breaking eighth straight State of Origin series win, coming on late in Game III, again as a makeshift back rower, as the Maroons held on against NSW to win a close game 12–10 in front of an ANZ Stadium record crowd of 83,813 fans.

Cherry-Evans also remained on Queensland's bench for Game I of the 2014 State of Origin series, in which incumbent halfback Cooper Cronk suffered a fractured arm, rendering him unavailable for Game II. This saw Cherry-Evans move into the starting halfback role for the loss which meant the end of the Maroons' 8-series winning streak. Cronk's recovery in time for Game III saw Cherry-Evans return to the interchange bench.

Game 3, 2018 saw Cherry-Evans return from a three-year absence at origin level. His great form in the game received widespread praise.

At the start of the 2019 State of Origin series, Cherry-Evans was named as the 15th Captain of the Queensland Maroons.

Cherry-Evans was selected by Queensland once again for the 2020 State of Origin series. Queensland would go on to shock a highly fancied New South Wales side 2–1.  Before the series had begun, some NSW media outlets described the 2020 Queensland team as the worst ever Maroons side.  At the presentation ceremony following the conclusion of Game 3, Cherry-Evans said "On behalf of the worst ever Queensland team, thank you very much".

References

External links

Manly Sea Eagles profile
NRL profile
MWSE player profile

 

1989 births
Living people
Australia national rugby league team players
Australian people of English descent
Australian people of Welsh descent
Australian rugby league players
Clive Churchill Medal winners
Manly Warringah Sea Eagles captains
Manly Warringah Sea Eagles players
Prime Minister's XIII captains
Prime Minister's XIII players
Queensland Rugby League State of Origin players
Redcliffe Dolphins players
Rugby league halfbacks
Rugby league players from Brisbane
Sunshine Coast Sea Eagles players
Wests Panthers players